Cassandra Atherton is an Australian prose-poet, critic, and scholar. She is an expert on prose poetry, contemporary public intellectuals in academia, and poets as public intellectuals, especially hibakusha poets. She is married to historian Glenn Moore.

Academic and literary work
Atherton completed her Bachelor of Arts (Honours in English and History), Master of Arts, Graduate Diploma of Education, and PhD at The University of Melbourne. She was supervised by Australian poet, Chris Wallace-Crabbe.

She was Harvard Visiting Scholar in English in 2015–16, sponsored by Stephen Greenblatt, a visiting fellow at the Institute of Comparative Culture at Sophia University, Tokyo, in 2014, and an affiliate of the Japan Studies Centre at Monash University from 2015. She was an editorial advisor for Australian Book Review in 2012–15 and is currently Poetry Editor of Westerly Magazine.

Her prose-poetry has been widely anthologised in publications such as The Best Australian Poems (2012, 2013, 2014, 2015, 2017), the Hunter Anthology of Contemporary Australian Feminist Poetry (2016), the International Prose Poetry Project's anthologies Seams (2015), Pulse (2016) and Tract (2017) and Strange Cargo: Five Australian Poets published by Smith/Doorstop in the UK. Her prose poetry has been published in international journals, including New Orleans Review, Stoneboat Literary Journal, Wisconsin, Stride Magazine, United Kingdom, and Scrivener Creative Review, Montreal. Readings of her poetry are collected on Penn Sound.

Atherton was a judge of the Australian Book Review's Elizabeth Jolley Short Story awarding 2014; the Victorian Premier's Literary Awards: Prize for Poetry in 2015 and 2016, the joanne burns microlit award in 2016 and 2017, and Melbourne's Lord Mayor's Poetry Prize in 2016 and 2017.

She has been awarded many grants and prizes, including a VicArts Grant (2016), an Australia Council Grant (2017), and Australian-Korean Foundation Grant (2016) [with Jessica L. Wilkinson and Dan Disney] and the Felix Meyer Fellowship. She received the University of California, Davis Mary Schroeder Award for her interview with Howard Zinn, the non-fiction Sanlane prize (United States) for In So Many Words and a Blanc Literary Prize (United Kingdom) for The Man Jar.

She is currently an Associate Professor in Writing and Literature at Deakin University where she received the Vice-Chancellor's Award for University Teacher of the Year. She is currently Head of Honours and Masters of Arts in Writing and Literature there.

In 2017, Cassandra and Paul Hetherington signed an advance contract with Princeton University Press to write a book on prose poetry.

Themes
Atherton's prose poetry explores the reanimation of canonical texts against a backdrop of popular culture references. She appeals to humour noir and the politicisation of the poet's private spaces. Geoff Page writes: "Though many of the poems are anecdotal they also advance by sound associations and other aleatory devices. They tend to be seriously playful with a bent towards the satirical, even the self-mocking."

Critical response
Atherton is praised for her prose poetry, and is likened to masters of the form. Michael Farrell writes: "Cassandra Atherton’s nervy style is distinct from an earlier generation of prose poets (Joanne Burns, Gary Catalano, Ania Walwicz); it feels both post-punk and post-John Forbes." While others, such as Chloe Wilson, have praised her for exploring the fundamental question of any poet: "They are works in which the speaker, moving back and forth between text and experience, continually asks an unanswerable question: 'How do I write the space between my heart and my pen?'" While Atherton's prose poetry is informed by previous poets and investigates the anxiety of the artist, Ivy Ireland has observed dark humour in her collection of prose poetry, Exhumed: "Dazzling, vibrant and terribly witty, ... Exhumed does not give itself over entirely to the horribly serious, gruesome images invoked by its title." Australian writer Kerryn Goldsworthy notes in a critique of Atherton's Trace (2015) that "The dense, intense prose is often funny, and incorporates all kinds of cultural allusions."

Collaboration
Atherton most often collaborates with artist and writer Phil Day and scholar and poet, Paul Hetherington. She is currently engaged in collaborating on Sketch Notes 4 and 5 with Day and a series of artist's books with both Hetherington and Day.

She was awarded a VicArts Grant (2016) to collaborate on writing a prose poetry graphic novel with Day and scholar/poet Alyson Miller, titled Pika-don.

Bibliography

Critical Works 
 Prose Poetry: An Introduction, with Paul Hetherington, Princeton University Press, NJ (2020).
 The Unfinished Atomic Bomb: Shadows and Reflections (New Studies in Modern Japan), David Lowe, Cassandra Atherton and Alyson Miller, eds. Lexington Books, Maryland, (2018)
 Travelling Without Gods: A Chris Wallace-Crabbe Companion, Cassandra Atherton (ed.), Melbourne University Press, Melbourne (2014) .
 In So Many Words: Interviews with Writers, Scholars and Intellectuals (interviews with American intellectuals: Harold Bloom, Noam Chomsky, Stephen Greenblatt, Camille Paglia, Howard Zinn, et al.), Australian Scholarly Publishing, Melbourne (2013) .
 Flashing Eyes and Floating Hair: A Reading of Gwen Harwood's Pseudonymous Poetry (2007) .    
 Intersections: Gender and History, Cassandra Atherton (ed.), Melbourne University Press, Melbourne (1997) .

Novels
The Man Jar, Printed Matter Press, Tokyo (2010).

Prose-poetry
The Heroic Age, in 'Five Ages, Authorised Theft', Recent Work Press, Canberra (2021). [Chapbook]
Leftovers, Gazebo Books, Potts Point (2020). 
Fugitive Letters, Recent Work Press, Canberra (2020) with Paul Hetherington.
Touch, in 'The Six Senses, Authorised Theft', Recent Work Press, Canberra (2019). [Chapbook] 
Pre-Raphaelite: and other prose poems, Garron Publishing, Adelaide (2018). 
Pika-Don [with Phil Day and Alyson Miller], Mountains Brown Press, Melbourne (2017).
Yellow, in 'Colours', Recent Work Press, Canberra (2017). [Chapbook]
Dilly Dally and Moon, [concertina books] Mountains Brown Press, Victoria (2016), with Phil Day (artist) and Paul Hetherington (poet). [Artist's book] 
The Taoist Elements: Water, International Poetry Studies Institute: Recent Work Press, Canberra (2016). [Chapbook]
Sketch-Notes Vol. (1, 2 & 3), Mountains Brown Press, Victoria (2015), with Phil Day (artist), [Artist's book].
Exhumed, Grand Parate Poets, New South Wales (2015) . 
Trace, Finlay Lloyd, New South Wales (2015), illustrated by Phil Day (artist) .
Pegs, International Poetry Studies Institute: Authorised Theft, Canberra (2015). [Chapbook]
After Lolita, Ahadada Books, Ontario (2010).

As editor 
 Alcatraz (with Paul Hetherington), Gazebo Books, Sydney (2022).
 The Language in My Tongue: An Anthology of Australian and New Zealand Poetry (with Paul Hetherington), MadHat Press, USA (2022). 
 Travel: An Anthology of Microlit, Spineless Wonders, Sydney (2022).
 Memory Book: Portraits of Older Australians in Poetry and Watercolours (with Jessica Wilkinson), Hunter Publishers, Brisbane (2021).
 The Anthology of Australian Prose Poetry, Melbourne University Press, Melbourne (2020).
 Scars: An Anthology of Microlit, Spineless Wonders, Sydney (2020).
 Shuffle: An Anthology of Microlit, Spineless Wonders, Strawberry Hills (2019). 
 Time: An Anthology of Microfiction and Prose Poems, Strawberry Hills, NSW: Spineless Wonders (2018).
 Landmarks: An Anthology of Microfiction and Prose Poems, Strawberry Hills, NSW: Spineless Wonders (2017).
 Cordite Poetry Review (with Paul Hetherington) (2016).
 Rabbit: A Journal of Nonfiction Poetry,(with Paul Hetherington) (2016).
 Contemporary Women’s Writing, (with Jessica Wilkinson) (2016).
 Axon: Creative Explorations, (with Antonia Pont) (2016).
 Media International Australia, (with David Marshall) (2015).
 Mascara Literary Review (2014).
 Ekleksographica (2010).

References

External links 
 Official website
 Deakin University Staff Page

Living people
Writers from Adelaide
University of Melbourne alumni
21st-century Australian poets
Australian women poets
20th-century Australian poets
Australian Book Review people
Academic staff of Deakin University
21st-century Australian women writers
20th-century Australian women writers
Year of birth missing (living people)